Political naturalism is a political ideology and legal system which believes that there is a natural law, just and obvious to all, that crosses ideologies, faiths and personal thinking, that naturally guaranties justice. It is inspired by sociological naturalism, and scientific naturalism's belief that the precision of natural sciences can be applied to social sciences, and hence to practical social activities like politics and law.

It may be seen as a natural law-based version of legalism/constitutionalism (especially of prescriptive constitutionalism, in the way it tries, idealistically, to make a constitution how it should justly be), and it bears relation with many constitutional monarchies (as in that system they too believe in rule of the law and in certain things who are naturally correct (like monarchy, monarchic institutions and traditions.

The roots of this legal political ideology may be found in positive visions of natural law (like John Locke's and Rousseau's, and even in the Founding Fathers of the United States. The Catholic German Centre Party politician and diplomat Karl Friedrich von Savigny also thought so.

Its main modern thinker is Egyptian legal scholar and creator of the Egyptian Civil Code Al-Razzak Al-Sanhuri. Through the Egyptian Code, many other Arab constitutions (in monarchist and pre-dictatorships Iraq and Libya and modern Qatar) ended up including political naturalist laws, and Al-Sanhuri himself wrote the Syrian and Jordanian civil codes and the Kuwaiti commercial code.

See also
Antinaturalism (politics)

References

Legal systems
Political ideologies
Naturalism (philosophy)
Theories of law